A list of protected areas of Azerbaijan:

Parks

Reserves 

 Ag-Gel Nature Sanctuary or Partial Reserve
Ag-Gelskiy State Reserve
Alty-Agachskiy State Reserve
Apsheron Nature Sanctuary or Partial Reserve
Arazboyu Nature Sanctuary or Partial Reserve
Barda Nature Sanctuary or Partial Reserve
Byandovan Nature Sanctuary or Partial Reserve
Dashalti Nature Sanctuary or Partial Reserve
Eller Oyugu State Nature Reserve
Gabala Nature Sanctuary or Partial Reserve
Garayazi State Reserve
Gil Adasi Nature Sanctuary or Partial Reserve
Gizildja Nature Sanctuary or Partial Reserve
Ismayilli Nature Sanctuary or Partial Reserve
Karagel State Reserve
Karayaz-Akstafa Nature Sanctuary or Partial Reserve
Kichik Kizil Agach Nature Sanctuary or Partial Reserve
Korchay Nature Sanctuary or Partial Reserve
Kubatli Nature Sanctuary or Partial Reserve
Lachin Nature Sanctuary or Partial Reserve
Pirkulinskiy State Reserve
Qusar Nature Sanctuary or Partial Reserve
Shamkir Nature Sanctuary or Partial Reserve
Sheki Nature Sanctuary or Partial Reserve
Shirvannskiy State Reserve
Zangezur Nature Sanctuary or Partial Reserve
Zuvandinskiy Nature Sanctuary or Partial Reserve

See also
National Parks of Azerbaijan
State Reserves of Azerbaijan

References
World Database on Protected Areas

 
Azerbaijan
Protected areas